Peperomia metallica is a species of plant in the genus Peperomia of the family Piperaceae. It is native to Peru.

References

metallica
Flora of Peru